Details concerning Confederate officers who were appointed to duty as generals late in the war by General E. Kirby Smith in the Confederate Trans-Mississippi Department, who have been thought of generals and exercised command as generals but who were not duly appointment and confirmed or commissioned, and State militia generals who had field commands in certain actions in their home states but were never given appointments or commissions in the Confederate States Army are in this list. Not all colonels or lower-ranking officers who exercised brigade or division command at any time are in this list but those most often erroneously referred to as generals are in the list. A few acting or temporary Confederate generals were duly appointed and confirmed as such. The full entries for these officers are in the List of American Civil War generals (Confederate).

Abbreviations and notes:
 Rank column: conf. = date appointment confirmed by Confederate Senate; nom. = date nominated by Confederate President Jefferson Davis; rank = date of rank.
 USMA = United States Military Academy at West Point, New York; "VMI" refers to the Virginia Military Institute at Lexington, Virginia; and South Carolina Military Institute or South Carolina Military Academy refers to their predecessor The Citadel at Charleston, South Carolina.
 Additional notes: ranks: lt. = lieutenant.

Assigned to duty by E. Kirby Smith

After the fall of Vicksburg, communication between the Confederate Trans-Mississippi Department and the Confederate government in Richmond was slow and difficult. The commander of the department, General E. Kirby Smith, appointed several officers to duty as brigadier generals and as major generals. He tried to get President Jefferson Davis to formally appoint these officers and nominate them to the Confederate Senate for approval. While Davis did appoint some of Smith's earlier nominees, at least nine officers who were appointed by Smith late in the war and may have served in the capacity of generals for a period of time were never appointed and confirmed by the civilian authorities. The ten acting generals assigned to duty by General Smith listed below are in this category. One of them, Horace Randal, was killed in action while commanding a brigade at the Battle of Jenkins' Ferry under the overall command of General Smith.

Incomplete appointments, unconfirmed appointments, refused appointments, posthumous appointments or undelivered commissions

The following Confederate officers are often referred to in historical writings as generals but their appointments were never completed or confirmed or their commissions were not properly delivered. The appointments of a few were withdrawn before they were voted upon by the Confederate Senate. Some of the officers' appointments were nominated to but not confirmed by the Confederate Senate. Some of the officers' commissions as generals were not delivered until after they had died. In a few cases, promotions of officers to general officer grades were posthumous even as early as the dates of appointment or nomination and clearly were meant only to be tokens of respect or honor. Other general officer commissions remained undelivered when the war ended. At least two general officer appointments that appear in the historical record were unauthorized battlefield appointments which were not approved and confirmed by the civil authorities as the war was coming to a close. Nonetheless, these officers are notable because of their assignments or actions in the capacity of a general, almost always a brigadier general. The Eichers call most or all such officers "might-have-beens." About 24 of the officers in the alphabetical tables above are shown by Warner and Wright as full grade general officers but in fact their appointments, confirmations or commissions were incomplete or they died or the war ended before they received their commissions. The entries for these officers will be moved to the section below as the article is completed.

State militia generals 
At the beginning of the Civil War, the Union Army incorporated most State militia units from the States adhering to the Union, mainly because they were offered for federal service by their States in response to President Abraham Lincoln's call for volunteers to put down the rebellion of the Confederate States. If the generals of these units did not receive appointments by the President of the United States and confirmation by the United States Senate and come into federal service with their units, new Union Army generals were appointed and confirmed for the Union Army brigades or divisions in which the units were placed. States often retained or further recruited some militia units for local defense but these units, including any generals, saw little, if any, combat in the Civil War as State units. State militia units remaining under State control did not leave their States for service elsewhere and few battles or lesser actions were fought in the Northern States. The battles of South Mountain, Antietam, Gettysburg and Monocacy were among the more notable exceptions.

The Confederate States Army followed a similar pattern with respect to incorporating volunteer militias but certain States retained a significant number of militia units for local defense. Because most of the battles of the Civil War occurred in Southern States, some of these units, and their State-appointed generals, saw significant service and combat. They were usually brought under the command of Confederate State Army commanders and forces in their areas but on a few occasions were the only forces available to oppose Union forces. State units fought in Texas, in Missouri, especially early in the war, in Virginia, especially during Jackson's Valley Campaign, in Mississippi, especially during the Vicksburg Campaign, in Georgia, especially during Sherman's March to the Sea, and in South Carolina, especially in the Carolinas Campaign.

Authors have not always pointed out that the generals in certain Civil War battles, actions or campaigns were State militia generals, not duly appointed and confirmed Confederate States Army (almost always Provisional Army of the Confederacy) generals. They were fighting for the Confederate cause and may have commanded a large number of troops but they are still properly described only as State militia generals.

Many of the Southern States' militia officers are identified by historian Bruce C. Allardice. Allardice, and others like him who take an expansive view of Confederate general officer appointments, identify many militia officers who were never mustered into national service for the Confederacy, nor did they serve as generals in any campaign or significant battle. The list below does not include those officers. It is limited to those known to have served in the field in command of militia units, on in another significant capacity such as guard duty in an active theater or in temporary command of Confederate Army brigades or divisions.

Below is a list of the more significant State militia generals from the Confederate States. These generals commanded and participated in battles and campaigns, at least in their home states, and thus provided some field service during the war. As such, they are likely to be referred to as Confederate generals in some books, articles or sources, even though they were State militia generals and not duly commissioned Confederate generals.

See also

General officers in the Confederate States Army
General officers in the United States
List of American Civil War generals
List of American Civil War generals (Confederate)
List of American Civil War generals (Union)
List of American Civil War brevet generals (Union)

Notes

References
 Allardice, Bruce S. More Generals in Gray. Baton Rouge: Louisiana State University Press, 1995.  (pbk.).
 Boatner, III, Mark M., The Civil War Dictionary. David McKay Company, Inc., New York, 1959. .
 Eicher, John H., and Eicher, David J., Civil War High Commands, Stanford University Press, 2001. .
 Faust, Patricia L., ed., Historical Times Illustrated Encyclopedia of the Civil War. Harper & Row, Publishers, Inc., New York, 1986. . Entries by Faust, various authors.
 Heidler, David S., and Jeanne T. Heidler, eds. Encyclopedia of the American Civil War: A Political, Social, and Military History. New York: W. W. Norton & Company, 2000. . Entries by Heidler and Heidler, various authors.
 Sifakis, Stewart, Who Was Who in the Civil War. Facts On File, New York, 1988. .
 United States War Department, The Military Secretary's Office, Memorandum relative to the general officers appointed by the President in the armies of the Confederate States--1861-1865 (1908) (Compiled from official records). Caption shows 1905 but printing date is February 11, 1908. https://archive.org/details/memorandumrelati01unit, retrieved August 5, 2010.
 Warner, Ezra J., Generals in Gray. Louisiana State University Press, Baton Rouge, 1959. .

External links

American Civil War Generals, retrieved February 18, 2008
Confederate Generals from West Point, retrieved February 18, 2008
The Generals of the American Civil War, retrieved from Archive.org, April 9, 2009
US Civil War Generals, retrieved September 12, 2010

Civil War generals Confederate Acting
 Acting
American Civil War
Generals
American Confederate acting

pl:Lista generałów wojny secesyjnej